Drummonds is an unincorporated community in Tipton County, Tennessee, United States. Its ZIP code is 38023.

Drummonds Elementary School is in Drummonds, TN.

Notes

Unincorporated communities in Tipton County, Tennessee
Unincorporated communities in Tennessee